Siemens Technology and Services Private Limited (STSPL) is the Indian subsidiary of German multinational engineering and electronics conglomerate Siemens that focuses on IT and management services.  The subsidiary is split into four units: Corporate Technology India, Siemens Corporate Finance and Controlling, Global Shared Services, and Siemens Management Consulting. Located in Electronic City in Bangalore, it has over 5000 employees. It has been certified with an SEI-CMMi Level 3, PCMM Level 3, ISO 27001:2013 (ISMS) and ISO 9001 certifications.

History
It was founded in 1992 as a joint venture between Siemens Ltd (India) and Siemens Nixdorf Information Systems AG, Germany  under the name Siemens Information Systems Ltd.

Its name was subsequently changed to Siemens Technology and Services Private Limited.

See also
Siemens AG
List of assets owned by Siemens

References

Siemens
Software companies based in Mumbai
Technology companies established in 1992
Indian companies established in 1992
1992 establishments in Maharashtra